Triodia is a large genus of tussock grass endemic to Australia.  The species of this genus are known by the common name spinifex, although they are not a part of the coastal genus Spinifex. Many soft-leaved Tridoia species were formerly included in the genus Plectrachne. Triodia is known as tjanpi (grass) in central Australia, and have several traditional uses amongst the Aboriginal Australian peoples of the region.

A multiaccess key (SpiKey) is available as a free application for identifying the Triodia of the Pilbara (28 species and one hybrid).

Description
Triodia species are perennial Australian  tussock grasses that grow in arid regions. Their leaves (30–40 centimetres long) are  subulate (awl-shaped, with a tapering point). The leaf tips, which are high in silica, can break off in the skin, leading to infections.

Uses
Spinifex has had many traditional uses for Aboriginal Australians.Several species were (and are) used extensively as materials for basket weaving. The seeds were collected and ground to make seedcakes. Spinifex resin was an important adhesive used in spear-making. Burning spinifex produces a strong black smoke, and Smoke signals made in this way were an effective means of communication with families and groups over substantial distances.

The species Triodia wiseana is used for building shelters; bunched together it is used for trapping fish against creek beds. It is called  in the languages of the Yindjibarndi and Ngarluma people, the English term is hard spinifex. 

Triodia nanofibres have been used to reinforce rubber and latex products. As of 2023, a Brisbane-based company has raised funds to develop medical gels from spinifex resin.

Species
Species currently include:

 Triodia acutispicula Lazarides
 Triodia aeria Lazarides
 Triodia angusta (Burbidge, N.T)
 Triodia aristiglumis (Lazarides) Lazarides
 Triodia aurita Lazarides
 Triodia barbata R.L.Barrett & M.D.Barrett
 Triodia basedowii E.Pritz. – buck spinifex
 Triodia biflora Lazarides
 Triodia bitextura Lazarides
 Triodia brizoides (Burbidge, N.T)
 Triodia bromoides (F.Muell.) Lazarides
 Triodia bunglensis (S.W.L.Jacobs) Lazarides
 Triodia bunicola (S.W.L.Jacobs) Lazarides – southern porcupine grass
 Triodia burbidgeana S.W.L.Jacobs
 Triodia bynoei (C.E.Hubb.) Lazarides
 Triodia caelestialis G.Armstr.
 Triodia claytonii Lazarides
 Triodia compacta (Burbidge, N.T) S.W.L.Jacobs
 Triodia concinna (Burbidge, N.T)
 Triodia contorta (Lazarides) Lazarides
 Triodia cremmophila R.L.Barrett & M.D.Barrett
 Triodia cunninghamii Benth.
 Triodia danthonioides (F.Muell.) Lazarides
 Triodia desertorum (C.E.Hubb.) Lazarides
 Triodia dielsii (C.E.Hubb.) Lazarides
 Triodia epactia S.W.L.Jacobs
 Triodia fissura Barrett, Wells & Dixon
 Triodia fitzgeraldii C.A.Gardner ex N.T.Burb.
 Triodia helmsii (C.E.Hubb.) Lazarides
 Triodia hubbardii (Burbidge, N.T)
 Triodia inaequiloba (Burbidge, N.T)
 Triodia integra Lazarides
 Triodia intermedia Cheel – winged spinifex
 Triodia inutilis (Burbidge, N.T)
 Triodia irritans (Brown, R) – porcupine grass
 Triodia lanata J.M.Black
 Triodia lanigera Domin
 Triodia latzii Lazarides
 Triodia longiceps J.M.Black
 Triodia longiloba Lazarides
 Triodia longipalea Lazarides
 Triodia marginata (Burbidge, N.T)
 Triodia melvillei (C.E.Hubb.) Lazarides
 Triodia microstachya (Brown, R)
 Triodia mitchellii Benth. – buck spinifex
 Triodia molesta (Burbidge, N.T) – porcupine grass
 Triodia pascoeana B.K.Simon
 Triodia plectrachnoides (Burbidge, N.T)
 Triodia plurinervata (Burbidge, N.T)
 Triodia procera (Brown, R)
 Triodia prona Lazarides
 Triodia pungens (Brown, R) – gummy spinifex
 Triodia racemigera C.A.Gardner
 Triodia radonensis S.W.L.Jacobs
 Triodia rigidissima (Pilg.) Lazarides
 Triodia roscida (Burbidge, N.T)
 Triodia salina Lazarides
 Triodia scariosa (Burbidge, N.T) – porcupine grass
 Triodia schinzii (Henrard) Lazarides
 Triodia secunda (Burbidge, N.T)
 Triodia spicata (Burbidge, N.T)
 Triodia stenostachya Domin
 Triodia tomentosa S.W.L.Jacobs
 Triodia triaristata Lazarides
 Triodia triticoides C.A.Gardner
 Triodia uniaristata (Lazarides) Lazarides
 Triodia vella Lazarides
 Triodia wiseana C.A.Gardner

Formerly included species
Numerous species once considered members of Triodia have been reassigned to other genera, including: Austrofestuca, Chascolytrum, Danthonia, Dasyochloa, Deschampsia, Diplachne, Disakisperma, Erioneuron, Gouinia, Graphephorum, Leptocarydion, Notochloe, Plinthanthesis, Poa, Puccinellia, Rytidosperma, Scolochloa, Spartina, Torreyochloa, Trichoneura, Tridens, Triplasis, Tripogon, and Vaseyochloa.

See also
 Spinifex pigeon
 Carnegie expedition of 1896

References

External links
 Macquarie University.edu: "Hummock Grasslands in Australia"

Chloridoideae
Bunchgrasses of Australasia
Endemic flora of Australia
Poales of Australia
Poaceae genera
Taxa named by Robert Brown (botanist, born 1773)
Australian Aboriginal bushcraft
Bushfood